Emīlija Gudriniece (3 August 1920 – 4 October 2004) was a Soviet and Latvian chemist who specialized in organic synthesis. She focused on the practical use of substances and synthesized furacilin, for which she won a state prize. She was one of the first to recognize the potential of using vegetable oils as biofuels and initiated the study of rapeseed oil refining in Latvia. She was a prolific publisher, edited the Latvian Journal of Chemistry, and published a Latvian language textbook on organic synthesis methods. She was awarded multiple prizes and recognition for her work.

Biography 

Gudriniece was born on 3 August 1920 in the Rēzekne District of Latvia. She grew up in the farming village of Kromoni in the Kaunata Parish and then went on to graduate from the University of Latvia in 1948 with a degree in chemical engineering. Gudriniece began her graduate work in 1949, finishing with her Candidacy Degree in Chemical Science in 1952. During this same time frame, she won the Latvian Women's Motorcycling Championship twice, both in 1949 and 1953. She was hired as an associate professor in that year at the University of Latvia in the Chemistry Faculty, where she remained until 1958. In 1959, she moved to the chemical technology department of the Riga Polytechnical Institute to begin her studies for her habilitation degree, which was completed from the Nesmeyanov Institute of Organoelement Compounds of Moscow in 1960. Following her completion of the advanced degree, Gudriniece was made a professor at the Riga Polytechnic in 1961. She founded the Department of Organic Synthesis and Biotechnology in 1963 at the Polytechnic and headed the department for the next 27 years.

Gudriniece's basic research focused on organic synthesis and the practical use of substances for medicines, cosmetics, and industry. She synthesized furacilin and developed a method of utilizing it for industrial purposes which earned her the Latvian Soviet Socialist Republic Prize in 1957. She studied chloromethylated nitration, sulfonation, and the reactivity of cyclic 1,3-diketones, publishing over 600 scientific reports on theoretical and synthetic chemistry of heterocyclic and 1,3-dicarbonyl compounds. Her most recent work focused on studies of rapeseed oil in attempts to develop techniques for the separation of lipids and refining of rapeseed oil as an industry in Latvia. She was one of the first to recognize the application of vegetable oils for biofuels. She also served on the editorial board of the Latvian Journal of Chemistry and at the time of her death was coauthor of the only textbook in the Latvian language on organic synthesis methods. Gudriniece received many honors including the Gustavs Vanags Prize for Chemistry in 1972, the  Memorial Medal, election as an academician in the Latvian Academy of Sciences in 1978, Latvian Emeritus State Scientist in 1996, Professor Emeritus from the Riga Technical University in 2000, the Paul Walden Medal in 2000 and the Grindeks Award for her contributions to education in 2003.

She died on 4 October 2004, in Riga, Latvia.

Selected works

Notes

References

External links 

 WorldCat Publications
 Latvian Science Academy Publications list 

1920 births
2004 deaths
20th-century women scientists
21st-century women scientists
People from Rēzekne
Academicians of the Latvian SSR Academy of Sciences
Academic staff of Riga Technical University
University of Latvia alumni
Academic staff of the University of Latvia
Recipients of the Order of Friendship of Peoples
Recipients of the Order of Lenin
Recipients of the Order of the Red Banner of Labour
Latvian motorcycle racers
Latvian women chemists
Soviet motorcycle racers
Soviet women chemists
Burials at Forest Cemetery, Riga
Soviet chemists